The Mati Ke, also known as the Magatige, are an Aboriginal Australian people, whose traditional lands are located in the Wadeye area in the Northern Territory. Their language is in danger of extinction, but there is a language revival project under way to preserve it.

Language

Mati Ke, also known as Magati-Ge, Magadige, Marti Ke, Magati Gair, is classified as one of the Western Daly languages, and bearing close affinities to Marringarr  and Marrithiyel. In 1983 around 30 fluent speakers of the language survived, and by the early 2000s, some 50 people were thought to still speak some of it as a second or third language.

By the early 2000s the last completely fluent speakers were reckoned to be three people, Johnny Chula, Patrick Nudjulu and his sister Agatha Perdjert, both of whom who moved back to a government-built outstation at Kuy on the Shores facing the Timor Sea. Though living in close proximity to one another, they never spoke it together since in their social system communication between brother and sister after puberty was forbidden.

Social organization
The clan and totem system was described by the Norwegian ethnologist Johannes Falkenberg in 1962, based on fieldwork conducted in 1950.

History
The Mati Ke were one of several tribes living south of Wadeye between the Moyle and Fitzmaurice rivers. Many moved to Wadeye when a Catholic mission was set up there in the 1930s. Most descendants of the tribe dropped using their Mati Ke speech and adopted the majority language in the area, Murrinh-Patha, which is spoken by about 2500 people and serves as a lingua franca for several other ethnic groups.

Alternative names
 Maritige.
 Muringata.
 Muringa (Murinbata exonym)
 Muringe.
 Berinken, Berinkin, Berringin.
 Brinken, Brinkan.

Notes

Citations

Sources

Aboriginal peoples of the Northern Territory